算盤 or 算盘 is an East Asian abacus, and may refer to:
Suanpan, an abacus of Chinese origin
Soroban, an abacus developed in Japan, and derived from the suanpan